Aa Karaala Ratri is a 2018 Kannada-language thriller film directed by Dayal Padmanabhan and produced under his own banner, D Pictures.

The movie is based on a Kannada play by Mohan Habbu which was translated from the tragic English play  Lithuania by Rupert Brooke. Karthik Jayaram was nominated for Best Actor in a Supporting Role at the 8th South Indian International Movie Awards. The movie won the  2018 Karnataka State Film Award for First Best Film.

In September 2020, director Dayal had announced that he will be directing the Telugu remake of the movie which would be produced by Allu Aravind. The Telugu remake titled Anaganaga O Athidhi was directly released on the Aha. He had also revealed that he would be directing the Tamil remake. The Tamil version was  titled Kondraal Paavam released in 2023. The movie was also remade in Malayalam in 2023 as Pakalum Paathiravum  - thereby making it the fifth Kannada movie to be remade in three other South Indian languages after School Master, Sampathige Savaal, Devara Kannu and U Turn. Both the Tamil and Malayalam versions released in March 2023 within a span of one week.

Cast
Karthik Jayaram as Channa Keshava 
 Anupama Gowda as Mallika 'Malli'
 Rangayana Raghu as Muthanna 'Onti Mane Muthanna'
 Veena Sundar as Gowramma
 Naveen Krishna in a cameo appearance 
 Jaya Srinivasan
 Ashitha Chandrappa

Story
In an interior village, deep in Karnataka, a fortune teller visits a poverty-stricken family and foretells that their fortune will change overnight. A mysterious traveller (played by Jayaram Karthik) visits their home on the same day and requests to be allowed to stay overnight. What happens during that one intense night forms rest of the story.

Production

Development
The movie is based on a Kannada play by Mohan Habbu which was based on the Russian story titled The Return of the Soldier. Senior director S. K. Bhagavan had revealed that during the making of 1978 Kannada movie Shankar Guru, he had narrated this story to matinee idol Rajkumar.The film was planned to be shot in Ladakh and some preparation was undertaken, but in the end Rajkumar backed out as he felt the story was too dark.

Impressed by Mohan Habbu's story, Dayal decided to acquire the rights and make it into a full-length feature film. When Dayal entered the Bigg Boss house as a contestant his idea was strengthened when his fellow contestants JK & Anupama Gowda agreed to be a part of the film if it was made. Once out of Big Boss Dayal sprung into action and completed the entire script, along with co-dialogue writer Naveen Krishna, and narrated the full script to JK and Anupama once they were out of the Big Boss game.

Casting
Once the lead pair was fixed, Dayal zeroed in on Rangayana Raghu and Veena Sundar for other pivotal roles. Many of Dayal's contestant friends from Bigg Boss like Jaya Srinivasan, Ashitha and Diwakar are making character appearances in the movie. This film will be Jayaram Karthik's first release since his Bigg Boss stint as a lead and is going to be the second movie as a leading lady for popular tele-actress Anupama Gowda. Experienced Cinematographer P.K.H. Das is helming the camera. Sri (CrazyMindz) is the movie's editor. Ganesh Narayan is composing the music for the film.

Filming
The muhoorta for the movie is happened on 19 February in Oni Anjaneyaswamy Temple, Bangalore. Simultaneously Dayal's other movie PUTA 109, again starring Jayaram Karthik, is also being launched on the same day. The movie's shoot is to take place over 25 days in Balur, Chikmagalur Taluk.

Reception
The movie got 4/5 stars in TOI reviews. The Bangalore mirror rated the movie as one of the best movies of the year. Kannada Actor Sudeep said the movie was "gripping".

The movie has an 80% rating on BookMyShow. TheNewsMinute mentions that "seasoned" actors and "clever" director came together hand-in-hand to make an interesting suspense thriller flick.
Shyam Prasad S from Bangalore mirror said the movie is one of the best movies of the year and credited the convincing performances and brilliant technical execution for the success.
Cineloka credits the director's smart moves and decision to make a good movie after his recent failures to prove his mettle. Actors' performances and PKH Das' cinematography was praised too.

Awards
 Movie won 2018 Karnataka State Film Awards for First Best Film
 Director Dayal Padmanabhan won the Karnataka State Film Award for Best Director.
 Veena Sundar won the Karnataka State Film Award for Best Supporting Actress
 Karthik Jayaram Nominated for Best Actor in a Supporting Role in 8th South Indian International Movie Awards.

References

External links 

2018 films
2010s mystery thriller films
Indian films based on plays
2010s Kannada-language films
Indian mystery thriller films
Kannada films remade in other languages
Telugu remakes of Kannada films
Tamil remakes of Kannada films
Films directed by Dayal Padmanabhan